The 5th United Andhra Pradesh Legislative Assembly election was held in 1972. It was the fifth after formation of states. Indian National Congress won 219 seats out of 287 seats. While, CPI won 7 seats and Independent won 57 seats.

The number of polling stations was 29,721 and the number of electors per polling station was 828.

Results

Elected members

References

Andhra Pradesh
State Assembly elections in Andhra Pradesh
1970s in Andhra Pradesh